Joseph Thomas Cardwell (1912-1957) was a professional American football player who played offensive lineman for three seasons for the Pittsburgh Steelers.

References

1912 births
1957 deaths
American football offensive linemen
Pittsburgh Steelers players
Duke Blue Devils football players